Draco maximus, the great flying dragon or giant gliding lizard, is a species of agamid lizard. It is found in Indonesia, Thailand, and Malaysia.

References

Draco (genus)
Reptiles of Indonesia
Reptiles of Thailand
Reptiles of Malaysia
Reptiles described in 1893
Taxa named by George Albert Boulenger
Reptiles of Borneo